The Lusitanian flora is a small assemblage of plants that show a restricted and specific distribution in that they are mostly only to be found in the Iberian Peninsula or southwest Ireland. Generally, the plants are not found in England or western France even though suitable habitat almost certainly exists in those regions. The plants currently number about 15 species in total and include examples such as Irish fleabane, strawberry tree and St Patrick's-cabbage.  The group is of particular interest and importance since it is currently not understood how the current geographical distribution came about. This biogeographical puzzle has been a topic of academic debate since the middle of the 19th century.  Conflicting, and as yet unresolved theories centre on whether the Irish populations are a relict, surviving from before the last ice age or whether they have been transported there in the last 10,000 years.  Many of the species are also very restricted in their distribution in Ireland, and have become the centre of intense conservation efforts in recent years, for example the Irish Fleabane.

Gallery

References

Flora of Ireland
Biota of Ireland
Flora of Europe